Grieshaber is a German surname. Notable people with the surname include:

HAP Grieshaber (1909–1981), German artist
Patrick Grieshaber (born 1996), English cricketer
Robert Grieshaber (1846–1928), Swiss politician

German-language surnames